Palangi may refer to:
 Palangi, Dashtestan, Bushehr Province
 Palangi, Jam, Bushehr Province
 Palangi, Fars
 Palangi, Hormozgan
 Palangi, Baft, Kerman Province